Martin Zilber is an American  retired judge based in Miami-Dade County, Florida. He was elected to the court in 2014 for a term beginning on January 6, 2015, and departed the bench  in May 2021. After years of community service he is now a candidate for the city of Miami city commission.

Early life and education
Zilber was born in Miami Beach, Florida in 1962. Martin received his B.A. from the University of Florida in 1984 and his J.D. from the University of Miami School of Law in 1988.

Career
After graduating from the University of Miami School of Law, Zilber became a legal intern in the Miami-Dade county state attorney's office. In 1989, Zilber went to work as in-house general counsel to several transportation companies including Metro Transportation Services, Metro Taxi and Greyline Bus.

He became vice-president of mergers and acquisitions for Coach U.S.A., in 1997. After the acquisition of the company by Stagecoach, he became the president of the Taxi Cab, Limousine, and Paratransit Association. In 2001, he co-founded the firm, Stolzenberg, Gelles, and Zilber, and remained there as a partner, till 2014. From 2010-2014, Zilber also served as a traffic magistrate in Miami-Dade county.

In 2005 he was elected, to a four-year term, to the Coconut Grove village council. The council was responsible for voting on a variety of zoning and community issues. During his term, Zilber was elected chairman of the village council by fellow councilmen. The same year, he was appointed to the Jackson Memorial Hospital Public Health Trust. Zilber was recommended by Florida governor Jeb Bush and appointed by the Miami-Dade county commission. He served for ten years on the Miami-Dade county arts board and was active in the cultural and arts as vice chairman of the cultural affairs council of Miami Dade county. He was an adjunct professor at Miami-Dade College and Florida International University. Judge Zilber also serves as a board member for the University of Miami School of Law.

He was a judge for the Eleventh Circuit Court, in Florida, before resigning following an investigation into allegations of judicial misconduct. He was elected to the court, in 2014, for a term beginning on January 6, 2015 and expiring on January 4, 2027. He began in the Juvenile Dependency Division and Unified Family Court, and then the Felony Criminal Division of the Circuit Court. At the time he resigned, Zilber served in the Circuit Civil Division.

Zilber in 2023 ran for the City of Miami Commission.  Zilber lost to Sabrina Covo, obtaining only 12% of the vote.

Investigation into Misconduct
On April 9, 2021, the Investigative Panel of the Florida Judicial Qualifications Commission found that Martin Zilber had engaged in judicial misconduct.  He was accused of repeatedly treating staff with a lack of dignity and had improperly requested his staff to do his personal tasks, including asking his judicial assistant to assemble a scrapbook of what he claimed were his many accomplishments.  He was also accused of asking his pregnant assistant to repeatedly lift and move his chair.  The Commission found he was often tardy or absent from the courthouse.  Consequently, the Commission recommended that he be fined $30,000, suspended for 60 days, re-attend Florida Judicial College, and write letters of apology to his staff and former staff.  The judge submitted a resignation letter on May 14, 2021.   After investigation, the Florida Bar cleared Zilber of wrongdoing and issued a declaration of “no probable cause ”in a formal letter dated August 24th

Personal life
Zilber lives with his wife and two children in Miami-Dade County, Florida. His son Michael is also an attorney at the Carlton Fields Law Firm.

References

Living people
1962 births
University of Miami School of Law alumni
Florida state court judges
University of Florida alumni
Florida lawyers